Llano High School is a public high school located in Llano, Texas (USA) and classified as a 3A school by the UIL.  It is part of the Llano Independent School District located in central Llano County.  In 2013, the school was rated "Met Standard" by the Texas Education Agency.

Athletics
The Llano Yellow Jackets compete in the following sports 

Cross Country, Volleyball, Football, Basketball, Powerlifting, Golf, Tennis, Track, Softball & Baseball

State Titles
Girls Basketball 
2002(3A)
Girls Cross Country 
2000(3A)

Band
The Llano Yellow Jacket Band has won 38 consecutive first division marching awards, going back to 1979. It has also made a handful of state marching contest appearances, the most recent being in 2004 when the band made the state finals. The Yellow Jacket Band placed in the top five in the state in 1983, 1985 and 1987.

UIL Academic State Meet Titles
Journalism 
2007(3A)

References

External links
Llano ISD

Education in Llano County, Texas
Public high schools in Texas